Grosses Fiescherhorn is a mountain peak of the Bernese Alps, located on the border between the cantons of Bern and ValaisValais, halfway between the Mönch and the Finsteraarhorn. From the north both are well hidden behind other mountain peaks and can only been seen from Isch in Grindelwald (1,095 m). The mountain is shared between the municipalities of Grindelwald and Fieschertal.

Ascents are usually made from one of these three popular routes: one starts from the Mönchsjoch Hut, one from the Konkordia Hut, and the third from the Finsteraarhorn Hut.

Climbing history 

The summit was first reached on 23 July 1862 by H. B. George and Adolphus Warburton Moore, with guides Christian Almer and Ulrich Kaufmann. They used what is now the normal route, the south-west ridge.

The north side of the mountain was first climbed in 1926. On 13 August, W. Amstutz and P. von Schumacher reached the summit after a 15-hour ascent via the north ridge, which is the northern boundary of the Fiescherwand.

The first direct ascent on the Fiescherwand was made by W. Welzenbach and H. Tillmann in 1930. Welzenbach was an expert climber, who disputed the common idea of his time that an ascent of the Fiescherwand was impossible. The previous year, in 1929, Welzenbach and Tillmann climbed the north ridge in only 8.5 hours. The following year they started the ascent of the Fiescherwand on the morning of 5 September 1930, taking a line that ran directly to the summit. They reached the top that evening, after a 12-hour ascent.

See also

List of 4000 metre peaks of the Alps

References

External links
 Grosses Fiescherhorn on SummitPost
 Grosses Fiescherhorn (Die Viertausender der Alpen)

Alpine four-thousanders
Bernese Alps
Mountains of the Alps
Mountains of Switzerland
Mountains of Valais
Mountains of the canton of Bern
Bern–Valais border
Four-thousanders of Switzerland

pt:Fiescherhorn